Fyodorovka is a rural locality (a village) in Bedeyevo-Polyansky Selsoviet, Blagoveshchensky District, Bashkortostan, Russia. The population was 260 as of 2010. There are 2 streets.

Geography 
Fyodorovka is located 43 km northeast of Blagoveshchensk (the district's administrative centre) by road. Yevgrafovka is the nearest rural locality.

References 

Rural localities in Blagoveshchensky District